Ntinos Nikolopoulos (alternate names: Kostantinos) (born August 30, 1988, in Xanthi, Greece) is a Greek professional basketball player. He is 1.84 m (6 ft 0.5in) tall and he plays at the point guard position.

Professional career
Nikolopoulos began his pro career with  Xanthi in 2005. In 2010, he moved to the Greek club MENT, which was playing in the Greek 2nd Division at the time. In 2012, he joined the Greek club PAOK. He moved to Aries Trikala in 2014 where he stayed for two seasons. In 2015 he moved to Apollon Patras. In 2016 he moved to Machites Doxas Pefkon in Greek 2nd Division.

References

External links
Eurobasket.com Profile
Greek Basket League Profile 

1988 births
Living people
Apollon Patras B.C. players
Aries Trikala B.C. players
Machites Doxas Pefkon B.C. players
MENT B.C. players
Greek men's basketball players
P.A.O.K. BC players
Xanthi B.C. players
Point guards
Sportspeople from Xanthi